Xiphiagrion is a small genus of damselflies of the family Coenagrionidae. It has only two species: Xiphiagrion cyanomelas and Xiphiagrion truncatum.

References

Coenagrionidae
Zygoptera genera